Burnie is a port city on the north-west coast of Tasmania, Australia. When founded in 1827, it was named Emu Bay, being renamed after William Burnie, a director of the Van Diemen's Land Company, in the early 1840s.

, Burnie had an urban population of 19,550.
Burnie is governed by the City of Burnie local government area.

Economy 
The key industries are heavy manufacturing, forestry and farming. The Burnie port along with the forestry industry provides the main source of revenue for the city. Burnie was the main port for the west coast mines after the opening of the Emu Bay Railway in 1897. Most industry in Burnie was based around the railway and the port that served it.

After the handover of the Surrey Hills and Hampshire Hills lots, the agriculture industry was largely replaced by forestry. The influence of forestry had a major role on Burnie's development in the 1900s with the founding of the pulp and paper mill by Associated Pulp and Paper Mills in 1938 and the woodchip terminal in the later part of the century. The Burnie Paper Mill closed in 2010 after failing to secure a buyer.

Demographics
The population of Burnie is 19,918, of which 1,692 (8.5%) are First Nations people. 

The median weekly household income is $1,225, compared to $1,746 nationally. 24% of households total weekly income is less than $650 week, while 11.6% of households weekly income exceeds $3,000. This compares to national rates of 16.5% and 24.3% respectively.

34.2% of renting households, and 7.9% of owned households with a mortgage experience housing stress, where rent or mortgage repayments exceed 30% of income. 

84.4% of residents were born in Australia. 2.4% were born in England, 0.9% in New Zealand, 0.8% in India and 0.4% in Nepal and Philippines and 0.3% in Mainland China.

90.2% of people speak only English at home. 5.9% of households use a non-English language, including Mandarin (0.5%), Nepali (0.4%), Arabic, Punjabi, and Sinhalese (0.3%).

In the 2021 census, 53.4% of residents nominated no religion. 38.8% specified a Christian religious affiliation (including 11.4% Catholicism and 11.2% Anglicanism). Other religious affiliations include Hinduism (0.9%), Buddhism (0.7%), Islam (0.6%) and Sikhism (0.2%).

Facilities and education 
Tasmania's third largest hospital, The North West Regional Hospital is on Brickport Road. It provides both in and outpatient services for general medicine, general surgery, orthopaedics, psychiatry, and paediatrics.

The former Burnie Theatre closed in 1965 and was replaced with the multi-function "Burnie Arts and Function Centre" (formerly known as the Civic Centre). Other facilities include post office, police station, Supreme Court, public and private hospital, as well as numerous sporting and social organisations.

Burnie is also home to the Cradle Coast campus of the University of Tasmania, and campuses of the Tasmanian Polytechnic and the Tasmanian Academy. The University of Tasmania campus includes the Cuthbertson Research Laboratories run by the Tasmanian Institute of Agricultural Research.

Retail 
Burnie has a central business district with several national retailers such as Target, Kmart, The Reject Shop, Best & Less and Cotton On. Just outside the CBD there are other major retailers including Harvey Norman, Bunnings Warehouse, Spotlight, Godfreys and SuperCheap Auto. 

Supermarkets in Burnie include Coles, Woolworths and IGA.

Transport
Burnie Airport is located in the adjacent town of Wynyard, a 20-minute drive from the City of Burnie.

Burnie Port is Tasmania's largest general cargo port and was once Australia's fifth largest container port. It is the nearest Tasmanian port to Melbourne and the Australian mainland. As with other ports in Tasmania, it is operated by the government owned TasPorts.

The port currently operates as a container port with a separate terminal for the exportation of woodchips. The port was planned to be expanded in 2013 so that it could accommodate extra freight from the proposed north-west mines in the Tarkine.

Burnie was the terminus of the former Emu Bay Railway company operations.  The railway line is now known as the Melba Line.

Burnie is connected with Devonport via the four lane Bass Highway and a rail link which is used for freight purposes. Burnie is also connected to the west coast of Tasmania by the Murchison Highway.

Bus service Metro Tasmania provides transport around the city and its suburbs., Redline coaches used to service the North-West through to Hobart, but ceased this service in January 2021.

Coastal pathway 
The development of a coastal pathway will connect Burnie and Wynyard to Latrobe as part of a State Government and Local Government Council initiative to upgrade infrastructure on the north-west coast of Tasmania.

Suburbs 
The city of Burnie consists of a number of small suburbs including Parklands, Park Grove, Shorewell Park, Acton, Montello, Hillcrest, Terrylands, Upper Burnie, Romaine, Havenview, Emu Heights, South Burnie and Wivenhoe.

Climate

Burnie experiences an oceanic climate (Köppen: Cfb, Trewartha: Cflk), with mild summers and cool winters. The average temperature in summer ranges from 15.4 °C in December to 17.3 °C in February; with the mercury reaching as hot as 33.8 °C on the 31st of January 2009. In winter, the temperature ranges from 10.2 °C in June to 9.4 °C in July, with the thermometer reaching as cold as -2.0 °C on the 14th of August 1967. Relative humidity averages over 65% for the year.

Burnie averages 947.4 mm of rainfall per year. Most of the rain is during the cooler months from May to October. The summer months bring constant daily sunshine and only occasional rainfall with temperatures up to 30 °C on the warmest and driest days. Nearly every day from December to February has a maximum temperature of 16.8–24.6 °C.

Sport 
Australian rules football is popular in Burnie. The city's team is the Burnie Dockers Football Club in the Tasmanian State League. Their ground is West Park Oval.

Rugby union is also played in Burnie. The local club is the Burnie Rugby Union Club. They are the current Tasmanian Rugby Union Statewide Division Two Premiers and were promoted to the Statewide First Division for the 2008 season.

Soccer is also represented in Burnie, with Burnie United FC having four teams compete in the northern premier league; the women's team, under 18 team, reserve team and division one team. They also have youth sides in the under 14 and under 16 competitions. Their ground is located in Montello, Tasmania.

Burnie hosts an ATP Challenger Tour tennis event, the Burnie International, during the week following the Australian Open.

Athletics events include the annual Burnie Gift and Burnie Ten.

Archery is also represented in Burnie, with Burnie Bowmen Archery Club.  They were founded in 1958 and have influenced the development of archery along the northwest coast of Tasmania.  Its first target championship was held in 1959.   In 1972 Burnie Bowmen Archery Club was given the honour of holding the first National Championships to be held outside of a capital city.  In 2017 Burnie Bowmen Archery club hosted Archery for the XVI Australian Masters Games.  In 2020 and 2021 they were to host the National Youth Archery Championships and National Archery Championships, but due to covid-19 these events were cancelled.  Presently, Target and Clout shoots are conducted at Parklands High School Oval in Romaine, Burnie.  Indoor is conducted at the Upper Burnie Memorial Hall.  Field is conducted at the Blythe Scout Camp at Heybridge.

Media 
The Advocate newspaper was established in 1890 servicing the North West region. The mailroom is located in Burnie whilst the local press operations ceased in mid-2008 and were relocated to Launceston..

Burnie has access to the ABC, SBS, WIN and Southern Cross television stations as well as all new free to air television stations.

There are two commercial radio stations, 7BU at 100.9 MHz on the FM band and Sea FM on 101.7 on the FM band. Many Melbourne radio stations can be received in Burnie.

Notable people 
 Country music singer Jean Stafford was a resident of Burnie in the 1960s and early 1970s when she was a young wife and mother at the start of her legendary career. Most of her family still reside in or near Burnie.

 Zima Anderson - actress in Neighbours who played Roxy Willis
 Cameron Baird - Australian soldier, posthumously awarded the VC for actions in Afghanistan
 Josh Earl - Comedian and former host of Spicks and Specks
 Dale Elphinstone - Founder of Elphinstone Group and Tasmania's wealthiest person as of 2019
 Brendon Gale - AFL player Richmond Football Club
 David Guest - Australian field hockey player. 2008 Olympic bronze medalist
 Justin Heazlewood - Australian songwriter, author, actor and humourist also known as The Bedroom Philosopher
 Eddie Jones - Current head coach of the Australian Wallabies National Rugby Team and former coach of the  English and Japanese rugby union football teams.
 Jacqui Lambie - Senator for Tasmania - Jacqui Lambie Network
 Brody Mihocek - AFL player-Collingwood Football Club
 Vicki O'Halloran - Administrator of the Northern Territory
 Eli Templeton - AFL player-St Kilda Football Club
 Lachie Weller - AFL player-Fremantle Football Club and Gold Coast Suns
 Maverick Weller - AFL player-Gold Coast Suns and St Kilda Football Club

References

External links 

 Burnie City Council
 Watch historical footage of Burnie, Hobart, Launceston and the rest of Tasmania from the National Film and Sound Archive of Australia's collection.

 
Cities in Tasmania